Aikaterini Gegisian is a visual artist of Greek-Armenian heritage living and working in London.

She is a Greek visual artist of Armenian descent. In 2014 she completed a PhD at the University of Westminster in London. She has participated in international residencies such as Utopiana, Yerevan, Armenia; ARC Residencies in Cairo; Partage Residencies, Mauritius and PIST, Turkey. 
Solo shows include Who Doesn’t Like a Good Old Story ? at the Kalfayan Galleries in Athens; Pentalogy, Omikron Gallery, Nicosia, Cyprus; Diego Garcia, Centre of Contemporary Art, Thessaloniki and Picture This Atelier Space, Bristol; Falling in Place, Elefsina Cultural Center, Greece. She is represented by Kalfayan Galleries (Athens-Thessaloniki) and her work features in private and public collections internationally.

References

External links
 Official site
 Gegisian

Armenian artists
Living people
21st-century women artists
Alumni of the University of Westminster
Artists from London
Year of birth missing (living people)